Cake decorating is the art of decorating a cake for special occasions such as birthdays, weddings, baby showers, national or religious holidays, or as a promotional item. 

It is a form of sugar art that uses materials such as icing, fondant, and other edible decorations.  An artisan may use simple or elaborate three-dimensional shapes as a part of the decoration, or on the entire cake. Chocolate is commonly used to decorate cakes as it can be melted and mixed with cream to make a ganache, or cocoa powder can be lightly dusted on top of a cake.

Cake decoration has been featured on TV channels such as TLC, Food Network, and Discovery Family as a form of entertainment.

History 

The decoration of cakes arose in 17th-century Europe, typically for special occasions as a luxury good. When wedding cakes became part of the wedding ceremony, early cake decorators looked for ways to give wedding cakes a more outstanding look. The long tradition and history of the wedding cake paved the way for modern cake decoration. According to the author of Veil of History: Wedding Cakes, Past and Present, the first figure to begin the decoration of a wedding cake was the 18th-century cookbook author Elizabeth Raffald. She was also apparently the first to drape a cake with almond icing. Christmas cakes began to be decorated in the 18th and 19th-centuries, having evolved from Twelfth Night cakes, an earlier tradition that was baked and eaten on Twelfth Night, or the Feast of the Epiphany. These cakes were considerably rich and would be decorated elaborately only by the artist bakers to their own expense.

During the 1840's, the advent of temperature-controlled ovens and the production of baking powder made baking cakes an easier process. As temperature control technology improved, an increased emphasis on presentation and ornamentation developed. Cakes began to take on decorative shapes and were adorned with additional icing formed into patterns, including floral patterns, and food colouring was used to accent frosting or layers of the cake.

Although baking from scratch decreased during the latter part of the 20th-century in the United States, due to the increase in availability of ready-made cakes and cake mixes, decorated cakes have remained an important part of celebrations, such as weddings, anniversaries, birthdays, showers and other special occasions.

Types
A cake may be decorated using small adornments or embellishments made separately, and placed on top of or around the cake, or may be decorated by being covered with a form of icing or paste, either alone or in accompaniment to other decorations. Cake decorations can be made of edible material and food-safe plastics.

Fondant icing

Fondant, also known as sugar paste or ready-roll icing, is a soft, thick paste made of sugar, water, Gelatin, vegetable fat or shortening and glycerol. Fondant is typically sold in a variety of colours when bought ready-made; is easy to handle; and provides a smooth, matte and non-stick cake cover.

Fondant must be rolled out with corn starch to avoid it sticking to any surfaces. Once smoothed out and thin enough, fondant can be moulded into many different shapes, such as flowers or leaves, and may be cut into shapes and applied to a cake to build up decoration. Though primarily used to cover cakes, it is also used to create individual decorations to accompany cakes, consisting only of fondant with no cake inside.

As a relatively heavy form of decoration in comparison to traditional knife-spread frosting, extensive fondant application may weigh a cake down considerably, requiring a suitably sturdy cake base for support. Fondant remains soft once sculpted, unlike other forms of icing, which may harden when exposed to air.

Royal icing
Royal icing is a sweet white icing made by whipping fresh egg whites (or powdered egg whites, meringue powder) with icing sugar. Royal icing produces well-defined icing edges especially when decorating cookies and is ideal for piping intricate writing, borders, scroll work and lacework on cakes. It dries very hard and preserves indefinitely if stored in a cool or dry place, but is susceptible to soften and wilt in high humidity.

Marzipan
Marzipan is often used for modelling cake decorations and sometimes as a cover over cakes, although fondant is typically preferred as an outer layer.

Gum paste

Gum paste, also known as florist paste, is an edible, brittle material that dries quickly and can be sculpted to make cake decorations such as flowers or moulded designs.

Modelling chocolate
Modelling chocolate is a chocolate paste made by melting chocolate and combining it with corn syrup, glucose syrup or golden syrup. The chocolate is formed into a variety of shapes and structures that cannot be easily accomplished with other softer edible materials such as buttercream frosting, marzipan or fondant. Modelling chocolate can be made from white, dark, semi-sweet or milk chocolate.

Edible ink printing
Edible ink printing is also used in decorating cakes. After breakthroughs in nontoxic inks and printing materials in the early 1990s, it became possible to print images and photographs onto edible sheets for use on cakes. The process uses pre-printed images printed with edible food colours, which are then applied to various confectionery products such as cookies, cakes or pastries. Designs made with edible ink can be created with a specialty printer, which transfers an image onto a thin, edible paper, made of starches and sugars. Originally introduced as a specialty service provided by bakeries, this technology can now be used by home consumers using the specialized paper, ink and printers.

Techniques
Decorating a cake usually involves covering it with some form of icing and then using decorative sugar, candy, chocolate or icing decorations to embellish the cake. However, it can be as simple as sprinkling a fine coat of icing sugar or drizzling a glossy blanket of glaze over the top of a cake like a mirror cake style that uses a glaze of gelatin, sugar, water and sometimes chocolate. A cake turntable (or rotating tray) can be used to facilitate the process.

Icing decorations can be made by either piping icing flowers and decorative borders or by moulding sugar paste, fondant or marzipan flowers and figures. An embossing mat is a tool for cake decoration that creates embossed effects on the top of cakes, cupcakes or similar items. The user presses the mat down into cake dough or icing and the pattern embossed in the mat is transferred to the item. Embossing mats are often made of silicone rubber or similar flexible polymers.

Many icing designs can be made by piping tips; these come in many shapes and sizes. Tutorials are often made to model the different designs created by different piping tips.

“Naked Cakes” became a popular trend, most notably during 2020. In this decorating style, fillings are used between the cake layers but the outside is left unfrosted or sparsely frosted, with much of the cake itself still visible between and through the frosted areas. Naked cakes are often decorated with icing sugar or fresh flowers on top. They were especially popular as new types of wedding and engagement cakes.

It may be necessary to secure cake layers in place to prevent sliding or falling, especially for large cakes with several layers. Various forms of wooden skewers or dowels and plastic straws are commonly used for this purpose.

Large and complex structures can be made by cutting shapes out of cake and piecing them together (often secured together with many non-edible reinforcements). Pre-formed baking pans make it easy to create cakes in non-traditional shapes. Though while useful for producing multiple cakes of the same general shape, they do not have the endless customizability of hand-cut building blocks. Fondant and marzipan structures can also be used to modify the overall shape of a cake.

As an art 
Cake decorating has become a unique art form, with examples ranging from simply decorated single-layer cakes, to complex, multi-layered three-dimensional creation with extensive edible decorations.

In popular culture 
 Food Network's Ace of Cakes features baker and former street-artist, Duff Goldman and his shop, Charm City Cakes.
 WE's Amazing Wedding Cakes is a television series featuring several cake decorating companies across America and focuses on the crafting and design of the cakes.
 Cake Wrecks is an entertainment photoblog featuring user-submitted images of "unintentionally silly, sad, creepy or inappropriate" cakes.
 TLC's Cake Boss features baker Buddy Valastro and his shop called Carlo's Bake Shop in Hoboken, New Jersey.
 Netflix's Nailed It! is a competition show in which amateur bakers attempt cake decorating.

Gallery

See also

References

External links